Arlington is an unincorporated community along the Little Kanawha River in Upshur County, West Virginia, United States. Alfious Arlington Fidler, an early postmaster, gave the town his middle name. Its nineteenth century Fidler's Mill is listed on the National Register of Historic Places. Arlington is located south of Rock Cave.

Arlington's public schools are operated by Upshur County Schools.

References

Unincorporated communities in Upshur County, West Virginia
Unincorporated communities in West Virginia